The Bengal Film Journalists' Association Awards is the oldest Association of Film critics in India, founded in 1937. Frequent winners  include Meena Kumari (4 awards), Shabana Azmi (4 awards), Nutan (3 awards), Vyjayanthimala, Mala Sinha, Tabu, Rani Mukherji (2 each).

1930s 
 1938:
 1939:

1940s 
 1940: - No award given
 1941: - No award given
 1942: Durga Khote - Charnon Ki Dasi
 1943: - No award given
 1944:
 1945: Mehtab - Parakh
 1946: Geeta Nizami - Panna
 1947:
 1948:
 1949:

1950s 
 1950:
 1951:
 1952:
 1953:
 1954:
 1955:
 1956:
 1957:
 1958:Meena Kumari - Sharada
 1959:

1960s 
 1960:
 1961:
 1962: Vyjayantimala - Gunga Jumna
 1963: Meena Kumari - Aarti
 1964: Nutan - Bandini
 1965: Meena Kumari - Dil Ek Mandir tie Mala Sinha - Jahan Ara 
 1966: Mala Sinha - Himalay Ki God Mein 
 1967: Waheeda Rehman - Teesri Kasam
 1968: Nutan - Milan tie Naina Sahu - Hare Kanch Ki Chooriyan
 1969: Vyjayantimala - Sunghursh

1970s 
 1970: Suhasini Mulay - Bhuvan Shome
 1971: Sharada - Samaj Ko Badal Dalo
 1972: Rehana Sultan - Chetna
 1973: Zeenat Aman - Hare Rama Hare Krishna & Meena Kumari - Pakeezah (Special Award)
 1974: Nutan - Saudagar
 1975: Shabana Azmi - Ankur
 1976: Suchitra Sen - Aandhi
 1977:
 1978:
 1979:

1980 
 1980:
 1981:
 1982:
 1983:
 1984:
 1985:
 1986: Shabana Azmi - Paar
 1987: Shabana Azmi - Ek Pal
 1988: Smita Patil - Mirch Masala
 1989: Rekha - Utsav

1990s 
 1990:
 1991:
 1992: Dimple Kapadia - Drishti
 1993: Ashwini Bhave - Purush
 1994:
 1995: Kajol - Udhaar Ki Zindagi
 1996: Farida Jalal - Mammo
 1997: Tabu - Maachis
 1998:
 1999: Shabana Azmi - Godmother

2000s 
 2000: Pooja Bhatt - Zakhm
 2001: Karisma Kapoor - Fiza
 2002: Tabu - Chandni Bar
 2003: Rani Mukerji - Saathiya
 2004: Manisha Koirala - Escape From Taliban
 2005: Priyanka Chopra - Aitraaz
 2006: Rani Mukerji - Black
 2007: Ayesha Takia - Dor
 2008: - No award given
 2009: - No award given

2010s 
 2010: - No award given
 2011: - No award given
 2012: - No award given
 2013: - No award given

See also 
 BFJA Award
 Bollywood
 Indian Cinema
Bengal Film Journalists' Association Awards